The Herring Nunataks are two prominent nunataks standing  northwest of Mount Lechner in the western Forrestal Range of the Pensacola Mountains, Antarctica. They were mapped by the United States Geological Survey from surveys and U.S. Navy air photos, 1956–66, and was named by the Advisory Committee on Antarctic Names for Earl F. Herring, an aviation storekeeper at Ellsworth Station, winter 1957.

References

Nunataks of Queen Elizabeth Land